Recall elections for nine Wisconsin state senators were held during the summer of 2011; one was held on July 19, and six on August 9, with two more held on August 16. Voters attempted to put 16 state senators up for recall, eight Democrats and eight Republicans, because of the budget bill proposed by Governor Scott Walker and circumstances surrounding it. Republicans targeted Democrats for leaving the state for three weeks to prevent the bill from receiving a vote, while Democrats targeted Republicans for voting to significantly limit public employee collective bargaining. Scholars could cite only three times in American history when more than one state legislator has been recalled at roughly the same time over the same issue.

The Wisconsin Government Accountability Board (GAB) certified six recall petitions filed against Republican senators and three recall petitions filed against Democratic senators. Democrats needed a net gain of three seats to take control of the Senate. Republicans needed a net gain of one seat to gain a quorum-proof supermajority on fiscal spending. Of the nine recall elections, Democrats held on to all three of their challenged seats; Republicans lost only two of their six challenged seats thus they retained their majority in and control of the State Senate, albeit by a slightly narrower margin.

More than $35 million was spent on the recall races. The spending on the nine races compares to $19.3 million spent in 2010's 115 legislative races, and approaches the $37.4 million spent in the race for governor.

Successful petitions

Results
Primary recall elections took place in July. The first general recall election also took place in that month, with Democratic Senator Dave Hansen retaining his seat. Six general elections took place on August 9 resulting in four Republican senators retaining their seats and two being defeated with Republicans keeping a majority in the Wisconsin Senate. Two Democratic incumbents (Wirch, Holperin) prevailed in their own recall races on August 16, which left Republicans with a net one-vote majority in the Wisconsin Senate.

Primaries

General elections

County Results

'Placeholder' candidates
In all six Democratic-led recall attempts against Republican Senators, the Republican Party organized and supported the nominations of 'placeholder' candidates in the Democratic primaries (called "Fake Democrats" by some). According to the Republican Party of Wisconsin, the purpose of the placeholder candidates was to force Democratic primaries and delay the general election, allowing their incumbent Senators to have additional time to campaign. Robocalls were sent out to 20,000 conservative voters for candidate Isaac Weix in an effort to get Republicans to cross over and vote in the primary. All the placeholder candidates were defeated. The cost to the state was estimated to be more than $475,000.

State Republicans blamed the cost on Democrats, stating that it was "all State Democratic Party Chairman Mike Tate's doing", as they had promoted the idea of recalls, and said that Democrats should pay the additional cost. Although recall efforts against Democratic senators began about a week before Republican senators, the Wisconsin Democratic Party officially backed the recall efforts as early as March 2. Official state Republican Party support related to the recall elections occurred when the placeholder candidates were put in place in June.

Senate District 30
In Senate district 30, Republican candidate John Nygren, a State Representative from House District 89 in Marinette, was removed from the ballot in the July 19 recall election for Democratic Senator Dave Hansen of Green Bay. The state Government Accountability Board voted unanimously on June 27 that Nygren had received only 398 of the required 400 valid signatures on his nominating papers. This only left Recall Organizer David VanderLeest as the only certified candidate against Senator Hansen. The board had initially found that Nygren had submitted 424 qualifying voter signatures, but 39 signatures were challenged by Democrats as not being from Hansen's district, and 26 of the challenged signatures were determined to be invalid. Nygren filed a lawsuit in Dane County Court seeking to overturn the board's decision, but was unsuccessful.

Elector qualification changes
These recall elections were Wisconsin's first under provisions of a newly enacted law-making two significant changes to the eligibility requirements for voting—photo ID and a longer residency requirement (from 10 to 28 days)—as well as the minor change of requiring electors to sign-in on the poll book.

Voters were asked to show photo identification at the polls in order to vote. Because the law was signed on May 25 and had been in effect only since June 10, there was insufficient time for all voters without such identification to obtain a state ID card (a non-driving "driver's license") from the Department of Transportation. Consequently, in a "soft implementation" (practice for future elections), poll workers asked to see photo ID but did not require it. The photo ID serves as proof of identity but not necessarily of residence, which is a separate issue.

Political advertising strategies
Although the plan to eliminate most collective bargaining for public employees was the issue that sparked the recall campaigns, neither side talked much about that issue in the recall elections. Democrats were telling voters Republicans had gone the wrong way with the state budget by cutting schools and providing tax breaks to businesses and investors. Republicans touted their ability to honestly balance the state budget and keep taxes low.

Recall controversies
Pro-Walker protesters in Merrill, Wisconsin, attempting to recall Senator Holperin (D-12th District) claimed to be intimidated by a crowd of Holperin supporters, one of whom reportedly ripped up some of their recall petitions. Similarly, pro-union protesters in River Falls, Wisconsin, attempting to recall Senator Harsdorf (R-10th District) allegedly had their petitions snatched by a local man who drove away in a car before dropping them into a puddle.

On March 17, one Republican petitioner collecting signatures to recall Senator Hansen allegedly stole several personal belongings from a couple. The man in question was found to be from Colorado and had a felony record; he had come to Wisconsin with other out-of-state petitioners. On the evening of April 14, an apparent break-in occurred at an office building owned by supporters of the recall of Senator Hansen. The burglar allegedly made off with petitions, a computer, and T-shirts, worth $1,000 in total. On May 3, Professor Stephen Richards of the University of Wisconsin-Oshkosh was reprimanded for encouraging students to sign a recall petition against Republican State Senator Randy Hopper.

On June 22, the Wisconsin Republican Party filed a verified complaint with the Government Accountability Board against Shelly Moore for knowingly violating state law by using taxpayer-funded resources for political campaigning. Moore, a public school teacher, and WEAC union leader is challenging incumbent candidate Sheila Harsdorf in the 10th Senate district recall election. The Wisconsin Public Purpose Doctrine  prohibits the use of government resources for a nonpublic purpose such as campaign activity, and political candidates are prohibited under state law from unlawfully accepting anything of value for campaign purposes. Democrats responded by stating that Moore could not be campaigning, as the recall effort did not exist when the emails were written. 

On July 12, exit poll workers outside voting locations in Menomonee Falls and Butler were handing out what appeared to look like voting ballots to those who had voted. Handing out such pieces of paper is illegal within 100 feet of a polling location. Others were accused of blocking polling locations. Menomonee Falls and Butler are within Alberta Darling's 8th Senate district.

Later that month, Americans for Prosperity, a conservative group, began sending absentee ballots to Democratic voters in all districts undergoing recall elections, with instructions to return the ballots to the city clerk before August 11 even though the recall election itself is being held August 9 in those districts. In addition, the voters were instructed to return the ballots to what was claimed to be "the absentee ballot processing center", but was actually a mailing address for conservative group Wisconsin Family Action.

On July 29, the Government Accountability Board criticized a Republican-allied voter ID advocacy group We're Watching Wisconsin Elections, for publishing reference guides for election observers that featured "numerous significant and factual errors." For example, the reference guides stated that student voters using their college ID must present "a tuition receipt with their name and address on it dated within the last 9 months". Wisconsin voter ID law does not actually require such a receipt.

On August 1, the Republican Party of Wisconsin filed a complaint with the Government Accountability Board accusing Sandy Pasch's campaign of possible collusion with the group Citizen Action of Wisconsin, of which Pasch is a member of the board of directors. Pasch claimed she had had no contact with anyone at Citizen Action regarding any political activities. Gillian Morris, a spokeswoman for the Democratic Party of Wisconsin, and Robert Kraig, executive director of Citizen Action both stated that there was no coordination whatsoever between Pasch in the recall election, and Citizen Action. An open records request revealed a receipt of a talking points memo from Citizen Action during the Budget Repair battle to Rep. Pasch’s office. That same day, the liberal group Wisconsin Jobs Now offered free food and offered rides to vote. State election authorities questioned whether it was a violation of election law. Offering rewards in exchange for voting is illegal. The Milwaukee District Attorney later dismissed the complaint, after a staff member of the self-described conservative organization Media Trackers who made the charge recanted. On August 3, the anti-abortion groups Wisconsin Right to Life and Family Action allegedly offered gift cards and other rewards to volunteers, according to messages obtained by local press. A Milwaukee County prosecutor is reviewing the issue.

Newspaper endorsements
 The Capital Times endorsed Rep. Clark in the 14th SD.
 The Green Bay Press-Gazette endorsed Sen. Cowles in the 2nd and Sen. Olsen in the 14th SD.

Spending
The amount of money being spent on the recall elections was over $30 million, with $25 million of that coming from outside groups on both sides and $5 million being spent by the candidates. The flow of money came as unions saw the recall elections as the best way to halt Walker's agenda and to send a message to other states considering changing their collective bargaining laws. Unions played a significant role for Democrats by spending money on advertising and supplying manpower in all the Senate districts. Conservative groups responded with their own spending for the elections.

Spending by Republican organizations, such as Americans for Prosperity, is hard to quantify, as many of them do not report their spendings or receipts publicly. According to the Milwaukee Journal-Sentinel, roughly $12–$13 million had been spent on the recall elections by outside groups, as of early August, with conservative groups outspending liberals.

See also
2011 Wisconsin protests
2011 Wisconsin Act 10
Wisconsin Supreme Court election, 2011
Wisconsin Senate recall elections, 2012
Wisconsin gubernatorial recall election, 2012

References

Wisconsin 2011 Senate
Wisconsin State Senate elections
Senate recall